Rosutl is a rural locality (a selo) in Tlogobsky Selsoviet, Gunibsky District, Republic of Dagestan, Russia. The population was 80 as of 2010.

Geography 
Rosutl is located 43 km northwest of Gunib (the district's administrative centre) by road, on the Kudiyabor River. Sekh and Ala are the nearest rural localities.

Nationalities 
Avars live there.

References 

Rural localities in Gunibsky District